West Virginia Route 73 is an east–west state highway located in the Logan, West Virginia area. The western terminus of the route is at an interchange with U.S. Route 119 a half-mile north of Verdunville and three miles (5 km) west of Logan. The eastern terminus is at West Virginia Route 10 outside Logan.

WV 73 intersects the northern terminus of West Virginia Route 44 a half-mile west of WV 10.

Major intersections

References

073
Transportation in Logan County, West Virginia